The Duchy of Saxe-Saalfeld was one of the Saxon Duchies held by the Ernestine line of the Wettin Dynasty. Established in 1680 for Johann Ernst, seventh son of Ernest I, Duke of Saxe-Gotha.  It remained under this name until 1699, when Albert, Duke of Saxe-Coburg died without sons. His brother Johann Ernst of Saxe-Saalfeld became the new Duke of Coburg and the duchy was renamed into Saxe-Coburg-Saalfeld in 1735.

Dukes of Saxe-Saalfeld 
 Johann Ernst (1675–1729)
 Christian Ernst (1729–1745)
Renamed Saxe-Coburg-Saalfeld

Saalfeld
 
1680 establishments in the Holy Roman Empire
1735 disestablishments in the Holy Roman Empire